

Taratap is a locality in the Australian state of South Australia located in the state's south-east about  south-east of the state capital of Adelaide and about  north-east of the municipal seat of Kingston SE.

Tarap's name and boundaries were assigned on 3 December 1998.  Its name is derived from the Taratap triangulation station which itself is derived ultimately from “an Aboriginal waterhole in the Hundred of Peacock.”  The name was also used for “a local homestead.”

The principal land use in the locality is "primary production."

The 2016 Australian census which was conducted in August 2016 reports that Taratap had a population of 42 people.

Taratap is located within the federal division of Barker, the state electoral district of Mackillop and the local government area of the Kingston District Council.

References

Limestone Coast
Towns in South Australia